Carlos Galeano (born 13 August 1950) is a former Colombian cyclist. He competed in the sprint event at the 1972 Summer Olympics.

References

External links
 

1950 births
Living people
Colombian male cyclists
Olympic cyclists of Colombia
Cyclists at the 1972 Summer Olympics
Place of birth missing (living people)
20th-century Colombian people